Killara County is one of the 141 Cadastral divisions of New South Wales. The Darling River is its south eastern boundary.

Killara County was named after Killara Station with Killara believed to be derived from a local Aboriginal word.

Parishes within this county
A full list of parishes found within this county; their current LGA and mapping coordinates to the approximate centre of each location is as follows:

References

Counties of New South Wales